The 105th Massachusetts General Court was convened in 1884. It sat Watson F. Hammond, the first American Indian to be elected to the Great and General Court.

Senators

Representatives

 
 Julius Caesar Chappelle

See also
 48th United States Congress
 List of Massachusetts General Courts

References

Further reading

External links
 

Political history of Massachusetts
Massachusetts legislative sessions
massachusetts
1884 in Massachusetts